Richard J. “Dick” Brennan Sr. (1931-March 14, 2015) was a New Orleans restaurateur who, along with his siblings in the 1970s, transformed Commander's Palace “into the definitive modern Creole restaurant of its generation.”

The Brennan Family Restaurants owned many restaurants including Mr. B's Bistro and Dickie Brennan's Steakhouse.

Brennan and his nephew Pip were two founders of the Mardi Gras superkrewe Krewe of Bacchus.

Biography
Brennan was born in the Irish Channel. He graduated from St. Aloysius High School, now called Brother Martin High School. He played basketball well enough to be recruited by Adolph Rupp at the University of Kentucky but he chose to attend Tulane University and Clifford Wells before attending law school for two years.

References

American restaurateurs
Louisiana cuisine
1931 births
2015 deaths
Tulane Green Wave men's basketball players
Tulane University Law School alumni
Brother Martin High School alumni